James Tory may refer to:

 James Cranswick Tory (1862–1944), Nova Scotia businessman and politician
 James Marshall Tory (1930–2013), Toronto corporate lawyer